Sir John Manduell CBE (2 March 1928 – 25 October 2017) was the founding principal of the Royal Northern College of Music from 1973 to 1996 and the director of the Cheltenham Music Festival.

Early life and education
Manduell was born in Johannesburg, son of Matthewman Donald Manduell, of Cumbrian origin, a "leading headmaster" at Jeppe High School for Boys who had been a Major in the Royal Field Artillery during the First World War and was awarded the Military Cross and Croix de Guerre, and Theodora (née Tharp), a physiotherapist and "inveterate lacrosse enthusiast". The Manduells were long-established farmers at Wigton, Cumbria.

At the age of ten his family returned to England. He was educated at the Haileybury independent school near Hertford, then in Strasbourg, and at his father's alma mater, Jesus College, Cambridge, where he read Modern Languages. He then joined the Royal Academy of Music, where his composition teachers were William Alwyn and Sir Lennox Berkeley.

Career
From 1956 Manduell worked at the BBC as a producer in London, and from 1961 as Head of Music for the Midlands and East Anglia. In 1964 he inaugurated the all-day Music Programme, which later evolved into BBC Radio 3. He stayed at the BBC until 1968. He became Cheltenham Festival’s first Programme Director from 1969 until 1994. He was then appointed as the first Director of Music at the University of Lancaster, before accepting an invitation to become Founding Principal of the Royal Northern College of Music in 1971, a post he held until his retirement in 1996.

He held many other offices, including as programme director of the Cheltenham Music Festival for a quarter of a century (1969-1994), and as first chairman of the European Opera Centre in Liverpool from 1997. Manduell received the CBE in 1982 and was knighted in 1989. A memoir, No Bartok Before Breakfast, was published in 2016.

Manduell lived with his wife, the pianist Renna Kellaway (born 1934), in Bentham, where he died, aged 89, in October 2017. Renna Kellaway has kept up her links with the area as Artistic Director of the Lake District Summer Music Festival.

Commissions and tributes
In his various roles Manduell actively encouraged and promoted the work of young composers. Some 250 works were presented as a result of commissions by Manduell. Works 
dedicated to or commissioned by him include Lennox Berkeley's Antiphon (dedicated to Manduell, and performed in Cheltenham on multiple occasions from 1973), the 1983 Elegy and Scherzo Alla Marcia for strings by Gordon Crosse and Another Dream Carousel for string orchestra by Anthony Glibert.

In 2015 the Gradi Ensemble - Claire Bradshaw (mezzo-soprano), Henry Herford (baritone), Craig Ogden (guitar), John Turner (recorder), Renna Kellaway (piano) - with The New Ensemble and Nossek String Quartet, issued The Music of John Manduell. In 2020 Divine Art issued the CD Songs for Sir John as a tribute featuring works by 16 composers from different generations. A second volume, The Fabulous Sir John followed in 2022, including further tribute pieces and a sequence of works by Manduell.

Compositions
As a composer Manduell wrote mostly chamber and orchestral works. Early pieces include the Belloc Variations for piano and orchestra, performed by soloist Renna Kellaway (his future wife), and the Trois Chansons de la Renaissance, which have been recorded. There is a Viola Concerto from 1964 and a set of symphonic variations, Diversions (1969), for chamber orchestra. His String Quartet (1970), the solo clarinet work Prayers from the Ark (1978, first performed by Jack Brymer) and the Double Concerto (for solo Di-zi & Erhu, strings and percussion) were commissioned by the Cardiff Festival. ‘'Vistas’', a large form orchestral work, was commissioned by the Halle Orchestra and Kent Nagano and premiered in 1997. His string octet Rondo for Nine (2005) has been recorded by the Manchester Chamber Ensemble, conducted by Richard Howarth.

References

1928 births
2017 deaths
Commanders of the Order of the British Empire
People from Johannesburg
South African people of English descent
South African emigrants to the United Kingdom
Alumni of the Royal Academy of Music
BBC music executives
People associated with the Royal Northern College of Music
BBC radio producers
Presidents of the Independent Society of Musicians
BBC Radio 3